MGR Sivaji Rajini Kamal is a 2015 Indian Tamil-language comedy film directed by Robert, who also starred in the film in the lead role. The film stars an ensemble cast including its producer and dialogue writer Vanitha Vijayakumar, Nirosha, Aishwarya and Ramji in other lead roles. The film had a musical score by Srikanth Deva and was released on 8 May 2015.

Cast
Robert as Battu
Ramji as Kannamma
Aishwarya as Aishwarya
Nirosha
Vanitha Vijayakumar as Ayana
Jaguar Thangam
Srikanth Deva as Sri
Ganeshkar as Ganeshkar
Ashwin Raja
Vanitha Krishnachandran
Ravikanth as Vanarajan
Chandrika
Ganesh
Suresh
Powerstar Srinivasan as the church father (guest appearance)
Premgi Amaren as Premgi (guest appearance)

Production
The film was the brainchild of choreographer Robert and actress Vanitha Vijayakumar, who were keen to make a comedy film together. Robert made his debut as director, and cast himself in the film's lead role. Vanitha chose to produce the film for an old production studio, Vanitha Film Production, launched by her parents, Vijayakumar and Manjula in the 1980s. It subsequently became the studio's third film following Nenjangal (1982) and Kai Kodukkum Kai (1984). The film was titled MGR Sivaji Rajini Kamal after popular Tamil actors MGR, Sivaji Ganesan, Rajinikanth and Kamal Haasan – who Vanitha claimed she paid tribute through with the title. The film was edited by R. J. Anand, while Vanitha also wrote the film's screenplay and dialogues.

Actresses Nirosha and Aishwarya were also a part of the film, while comedians Powerstar Srinivasan and Premgi Amaren appeared in guest roles.

Soundtrack

For the film, music composer Srikanth Deva was credited as Sri.

Release
The film opened in May 2015 to negative reviews from critics. A reviewer from The New Indian Express opined that "Surely, this writer-director team, which is associated with the film industry for a long time, could have done some homework before they ventured into their debut project". A reviewer from DesiMartini.com wrote "the script was intended to make the audience laugh but the execution was annoying", and that "other technical aspects are very mediocre and very ordinary stuff" and the "writing is very amateurish and the film is very low on production values". Another reviewer noted that the film was "amateurishly written and poorly executed". The film did not perform well at the box office.

In 2019, Robert denied that he was romantically involved with Vanitha and claimed that the pair decided to make the film on professional terms. He added that he and Vanitha told the media about their alleged relationship in order to promote the film. Vanitha later called out Robert for his false interviews, and stated that the film was indeed produced when the pair were in a relationship.

References

External links

MGR Sivaji Rajini Kamal at YouTube

2015 films
2010s Tamil-language films
2015 comedy films
Indian slapstick comedy films
Films scored by Srikanth Deva
2015 directorial debut films